, known simply as Shunsuke to some fans, is a Japanese professional baseball outfielder. He was born on August 17, 1987 in Fukuoka, Japan. He is currently playing for the Hanshin Tigers of the NPB.

References

1987 births
Living people
Baseball people from Fukuoka Prefecture
Kindai University alumni
Nippon Professional Baseball outfielders
Japanese baseball players
Hanshin Tigers players